Milen Ivanov Petkov (born 12 January 1974) is a former Bulgarian international football player, who played as a defensive midfielder.

Club career
Petkov started his career in the Dobrudzha Dobrich and then played with great success in CSKA Sofia, where he won 1 Bulgarian League and 2 Bulgarian Cups. In January 2000, the then new coach of AEK Athens, Giannis Pathiakakis brought him to the club. The following seasons at the clun were also good where he played either as a starter or as a substitute. But affected by various injuries he his declining performances during his last seasons resulted in leaving AEK in the summer of 2005, having won 2 Greek Cups. Afterwards, he played for one season at Atromitos and then for two seasons in the second division side, Ilysiakos. In 2008 he returned to Bulgaria and played in Cherno More for two seasons before ending his career in Dobrudzha in 2011.

International career
Petkov was part of the Bulgarian World Cup 1998 team and Bulgarian 2004 European Football Championship team, which was eliminated in the first round, finishing bottom of Group C, having finished top of Qualifying Group 8 in the pre-tournament phase. Between 1997 and 2004 for Bulgaria national football team he had 37 caps and scored 1 goals.

After football
Petkov after the end of his career as a footballer, took up coaching and also worked as a agent.

Personal life
Petkov's son, Aleks Petkov, is also a professional footballer.

International goals

Honours
CSKA Sofia
Bulgarian League: 1996–97
Bulgarian Cup: 1997, 1999

AEK Athens
Greek Cup: 1999–2000, 2001–02

References

External links
 

1974 births
Living people
Bulgarian footballers
People from General Toshevo
Bulgaria international footballers
Bulgarian expatriate footballers
Association football midfielders
AEK Athens F.C. players
PFC CSKA Sofia players
1998 FIFA World Cup players
UEFA Euro 2004 players
Expatriate footballers in Greece
First Professional Football League (Bulgaria) players
Super League Greece players
PFC Cherno More Varna players
PFC Dobrudzha Dobrich players
Atromitos F.C. players
Ilisiakos F.C. players
Bulgarian expatriate sportspeople in Greece